Albert Miravent Sans (born 14 June 1994) is a Spanish footballer who plays as a midfielder for CF Reddis.

Club career
Born in Tarragona, Catalonia, Miravent joined RCD Espanyol's youth setup in 2008, aged 14, after starting it out at Gimnàstic de Tarragona. He made his senior debuts with the former's reserves in the 2011–12 campaign, being promoted from Tercera División.

On 11 July 2014 Miravent moved abroad for the first time in his career, joining Italian Lega Pro side San Marino Calcio. He made his professional debut on 13 September, coming on as a late substitute in a 1–1 home draw against Carrarese Calcio.

On 8 January 2015 Miravent and compatriot Gil Muntadas rescinded his link with the club. Both returned to their home country and signed for fourth level's CF Pobla de Mafumet seven days later.

References

External links

1994 births
Living people
Sportspeople from Tarragona
Spanish footballers
Footballers from Catalonia
Association football midfielders
Segunda División B players
Tercera División players
Tercera Federación players
Primera Catalana players
RCD Espanyol B footballers
CF Pobla de Mafumet footballers
CD Teruel footballers
CF Reus Deportiu B players
FC Ascó players
Serie C players
A.S.D. Victor San Marino players
Spain youth international footballers
Spanish expatriate footballers
Spanish expatriate sportspeople in Italy
Expatriate footballers in Italy